Mārtiņš Ints Rītiņš (19 October 1949 – 11 February 2022) was a British-born Latvian chef, restaurateur, businessman, culinary TV presenter and author. He was also the President of Latvia’s Slow Food Association and has been called "The Father of Modern Latvian Cuisine".

Biography 
Rītiņš was born in 1949 at a refugee camp in Nantwich, Cheshire, to Latvian parents who had fled Latvia at the end of World War II. He grew up in Corby, Northamptonshire before moving to London to become a chef.

In 1971, Rītiņš graduated from Westminster Technical College in London. From the mid-1970s to the early 1990s, he worked for various catering companies in the Grand Metropolitan hotel chain. From 1984 to 1992, Rītiņš owned Martins Catering Ltd in Toronto, Canada.

In 1993, he moved to Latvia and founded the restaurant Vincents a year later, becoming its director and executive chef. In 1995, Rītiņš started hosting his own cooking television show on LTV Kas var būt labāks par šo? ("What Could Be Better Than This?"), where he travelled around the world and introduced foreign ingredients and dishes to the Latvian audience. In 1997. Rītiņš published a cookbook Mielasts ar Mārtiņu ("A Meal With Mārtiņš").

From the late 1990s and early 2000s, he started organizing official state banquets and dinners, and catering to royalty, presidents and celebrities, such as the Akihito, Xi Jinping, Queen Elizabeth II, George W. Bush, Tony Blair, Romano Prodi, Angela Merkel, and Sir Elton John.

In 2007, Rītiņš received the Order of the Three Stars for his "service to gastronomy and culinary education in Latvia". In 2015, Kas var būt labāks par šo? was discontinued due to disagreements between Rītiņš and the director of the show. Three years later Rītiņš returned to television with a cooking television show on LNT called Tuč, tuč Rītiņš.

On 1 July 2017, he retired as the director of Vincents, but returned to it in 2020. The same year his biography De Profundis written by a close family friend Linda Apse was published.

On 11 February 2022, Rītiņš died of complications from COVID-19 at Pauls Stradiņš Clinical University Hospital in Riga at the age of 72.

Cooking style 
Rītiņš has described his cooking style as "fine dining influenced by Escoffier". It is rooted in French cuisine, which was what he was brought up on. Rītiņš has characterised his cooking as much lighter, less greasy and less fatty than the traditional Latvian cuisine, which he jokingly summarized as "pork, pork, pork, pork", although confessing to liking grey peas with speck. He recalled that during the early days in Latvia this meant that his Caesar salad was sometimes sent back because it did not contain mayonnaise as Latvians were used to. Rītiņš has named Alice Waters and his first boss Harvey Smith, as his culinary mentors.

Books
 Mārtiņš Rītiņš (1997). Mielasts ar Mārtiņu. Jumava.

References

External links
 The Chat Chamber #12 Mārtiņš Rītiņš. 24 May 2021. Riga Graduate School of Law. Retrieved 11 February 2022.
 Vincents Restorans

1949 births
2022 deaths
Latvian television personalities
20th-century Latvian businesspeople
21st-century Latvian businesspeople
British emigrants to Latvia
People from Nantwich
English people of Latvian descent
Recipients of the Order of the Three Stars
Latvian chefs
Television chefs
Latvian LGBT people
Gay men
Deaths from the COVID-19 pandemic in Latvia